The Book of Clarence is an upcoming American epic film written and directed by Jeymes Samuel. The film is due for release on September 22, 2023.

Premise
A man named Clarence living in 29 A.D. Jerusalem looks to capitalize on the rise of Jesus Christ.

Cast
 LaKeith Stanfield as Clarence
 Omar Sy
 RJ Cyler
 Benedict Cumberbatch
 James McAvoy
 Anna Diop
 David Oyelowo
 Alfre Woodard
 Marianne Jean-Baptiste
 Caleb McLaughlin
 Teyana Taylor
 Babs Olusanmokun
 Eric Kofi Abrefa
 Nicholas Pinnock
 Micheal Ward
 Chase Dillon
 Tom Glynn-Carney
 Tom Vaughan-Lawlor

Production
Jeymes Samuel announced that The Book of Clarence would be his next film during an interview with Deadline Hollywood. He stated that LaKeith Stanfield would portray the titular Clarence, and cited biblical epics such as The Ten Commandments, The Greatest Story Ever Told, Samson and Delilah and Ben-Hur as films he was modelling Clarence after. In October, Omar Sy joined the cast, with Legendary Pictures acquiring the project. In December, RJ Cyler, Benedict Cumberbatch, James McAvoy, Anna Diop, David Oyelowo, Alfre Woodard and Marianne Jean-Baptiste were among several additions to the cast. Rob Hardy will serve as cinematographer, Tom Eagles as editor, Peter Walpole as production designer, and Samuel composing the score.

Filming began in November 2022 in Matera, Italy.

Release
The film is set for a theatrical release on September 22, 2023.

References

External links

Upcoming films
American epic films
Films shot in Matera
Legendary Pictures films
Films set in ancient Israel